The 1985–86 network television schedule for the three major English language commercial broadcast networks in the United States. The schedule covers primetime hours from September 1985 through August 1986. The schedule is followed by a list per network of returning series, new series, and series cancelled after the 1984–85 season.

PBS is not included; member stations have local flexibility over most of their schedules and broadcast times for network shows may vary.

New series are highlighted in bold.

All times are U.S. Eastern and Pacific Time (except for some live sports or events). Subtract for one hour for Central, Mountain, Alaska and Hawaii-Aleutian times.

Each of the 30 highest-rated shows is listed with its rank and rating as determined by Nielsen Media Research.

This was also the first television season wherein the Nielsen people meter technology was used for the nationwide audience measurement system, largely replacing the diaries system in place from the 1950-1951 television season.

Most of the ratings come from AmericanRadioHistory.com's PDF archive.

Legend

Sunday

Monday

Tuesday

Wednesday

Thursday

Friday

Note: Diff'rent Strokes 1-hour Season 8 Premiered on September 27 at 9:00pm

Saturday

Note: Due to the death of Samantha Smith and her father in a plane crash, ABC ceased production on Lime Street and was forced to move Lady Blue into its slot.

By network

ABC

Returning series
20/20
The ABC Sunday Night Movie
Benson
Diff'rent Strokes (moved from NBC)
Dynasty
The Fall Guy
Hardcastle and McCormick
Hotel
Life's Most Embarrassing Moments
The Love Boat
Mr. Belvedere
Monday Night Baseball
Monday Night Football
Moonlighting
Ripley's Believe It or Not!
Webster
Who's the Boss?

New series
The Colbys *
The Disney Sunday Movie *
Fortune Dane *
Growing Pains
He's the Mayor *
Hollywood Beat
The Insiders
Joe Bash *
Lady Blue
Lime Street
MacGyver
Mr. Sunshine *
Our Family Honor
Perfect Strangers *
The Redd Foxx Show *
Shadow Chasers *
Spenser: For Hire

Not returning from 1984–85:
Call to Glory
Eye to Eye
Finder of Lost Loves
Foul-Ups, Bleeps & Blunders
Glitter
Hawaiian Heat
Jessie
MacGruder and Loud
Matt Houston
Me and Mom
Off the Rack
Paper Dolls
People Do the Craziest Things
Rock 'n' Roll Summer Action
Street Hawk
T. J. Hooker @
Three's a Crowd
Wildside

CBS

Returning series
60 Minutes
Airwolf
Cagney & Lacey
CBS Sunday Movie
Crazy Like a Fox
Dallas
Falcon Crest
Kate & Allie
Knots Landing
Magnum, P.I.
Murder, She Wrote
Newhart
Scarecrow and Mrs. King
Simon & Simon
Trapper John, M.D.

New series
Bridges to Cross *
Charlie & Co.
The Equalizer
Fast Times *
Foley Square *
George Burns Comedy Week
Hometown
Leo & Liz in Beverly Hills *
Mary *
Melba *
Morningstar/Eveningstar *
Stir Crazy
Tough Cookies *
The Twilight Zone
West 57th *

Not returning from 1984–85:
AfterMASH
Alice
Charles in Charge (Moved to Syndication)
Cover Up
Detective in the House
Double Dare
Dreams
The Dukes of Hazzard
E/R
I Had Three Wives
The Jeffersons
The Lucie Arnaz Show
Mickey Spillane's Mike Hammer +
Otherworld

NBC

Returning series
The A-Team
Cheers
The Cosby Show
The Facts of Life
Family Ties
Gimme a Break!
Highway to Heaven
Hill Street Blues
Hunter
Knight Rider
Miami Vice
NBC Sunday Night Movie
NBC Monday Night at the Movies
Night Court
Punky Brewster
Remington Steele
Riptide
St. Elsewhere
Silver Spoons
TV's Bloopers & Practical Jokes

New series
1986 *
227
Alfred Hitchcock Presents
All Is Forgiven *
Amazing Stories
Blacke's Magic *
Fathers and Sons *
The Golden Girls
Hell Town
The Last Precinct *
Me & Mrs. C *
Misfits of Science
Stingray *
Valerie *
You Again? *

Not returning from 1984–85:
Berrenger's
The Best Times
Code Name: Foxfire
Diff'rent Strokes (moved to ABC)
Double Trouble
Half Nelson
Hot Pursuit
It's Your Move
Our Time
Partners in Crime
Sara
Spencer/Under One Roof
V

Note: The * indicates that the program was introduced in midseason.

^ Diff'rent Strokes switched networks for the 1985–1986 season.

+ Mike Hammer abruptly ended production after series star Stacy Keach was sentenced to six months in prison for cocaine possession. Production resumed during the 1986–1987 season.

@ T. J. Hooker continued production for CBS' late night schedule for the 1985–1986 season.

References

United States primetime network television schedules
1985 in American television
1986 in American television